The Drumright Gasoline Plant No. 2, near Drumright, Oklahoma, began operation August 2, 1917.  It was listed on the National Register of Historic Places in 1982.  The listing included four contributing buildings and five contributing structures.

It was located north of Drumright and was used to exploit part of the Cushing-Drumright Oil Field.

It included a one-story office building  in plan.  It included an engine room  in plan.  It included two original water towers.

It was the only operating casinghead gasoline plant surviving out of about 250 in the area that operated at the peak.

Sometime between 1980 and 2020 it was removed.

References

National Register of Historic Places in Creek County, Oklahoma
Buildings and structures completed in 1917